Gareth Peter Rees (born 8 April 1985) is a Welsh cricketer. He is a left-handed batsman and a left-arm medium-pace bowler who plays for Glamorgan.

Rees was born in Swansea. He represented Wales U17s at rugby and was a prominent member of the successful Felinfoel Youth Rugby team. He graduated with first class honours in Maths and Physics from the University of Bath.

In 2003 Rees played for Wales Minor Counties and Glamorgan's 2nd XI. He finally made his County Championship debut against Gloucestershire at Cheltenham. He won his county cap in 2009. Rees also represented the MCC in the opening game of the 2012 season against Lancashire.

By the end of the 2013 season, Rees is still going strong for Glamorgan, having scored two centuries during the season in the County Championship, but he did not make any appearances in the Friends Life t20.

Career best performances
as of 22 October 2013

External links 

 Gareth Rees at Glamorgan CCC

1985 births
Living people
Alumni of the University of Bath
Cricketers from Swansea
Felinfoel RFC players
Glamorgan cricketers
Marylebone Cricket Club cricketers
Rugby union players from Swansea
Team Bath rugby union players
Wales National County cricketers
Welsh cricketers
Welsh rugby union players